Noshur or Nashur, also rendered as Nowshur or Nushur, may refer to:
 Noshur-e Olya
 Noshur-e Sofla
 Noshur-e Vosta